Liturgy is a Christian term with several meanings:
 Christian liturgy
 Divine Liturgy

Liturgy may also refer to:
 Liturgy (ancient Greece) a public service by the richest citizens
 Liturgy (ballet), Christopher Wheeldon's ballet
 Liturgy (band), a black metal band from Brooklyn, New York